1490 km is a rural locality (a railway station) in Shafranovskoye Rural Settlement of Alsheyevsky District, Russia. The  population was 12 .

Streets 
There are no named streets.

References 

Rural localities in Alsheyevsky District